The 1992 Missouri Valley Conference men's soccer season was the 2nd season of men's varsity soccer in the conference.

The 1992 Missouri Valley Conference Men's Soccer Tournament was hosted and won by Creighton.

Teams

MVC Tournament

See also 

 Missouri Valley Conference
 Missouri Valley Conference men's soccer tournament
 1992 NCAA Division I men's soccer season
 1992 in American soccer

References 

Missouri Valley Conference
1992 NCAA Division I men's soccer season